Mjørkadalur is a valley on the Faroese island of Streymoy in the Tórshavnar municipality. It has no postal code. It is located on the mountain of Sornfelli above the fjord of Kalbaksfjørður. The buildings in Mjørkadalur used to be part of the Island Command Faroes, but now a part of the building is used as a detention centre for prisoners who serve short sentences. Criminals from the Faroe Islands who serve longer sentences are sent to prisons in Denmark, as the detention centre only has room for 12 inmates.

History 
It was the site of a Danish military installation (Island Command Faroes) and NATO early warning radar system until the Danish authorities closed it, and handed the key of the building to the Mayor of Tórshavn on 2 July 2002. The radar continued to work until 1 January 2007. Earlier up to 200 persons from the Danish defense were living in Mjørkadalur. On 15 November 2010 the last equipment was shut down.

Since 10 February 2011 the building in Mjørkadalur has been the only detention of the Faroe Islands. It used to be in Tórshavn, but due to problems with mold in the building in Tórshavn, the detention was moved to Mjørkadalur.

One of the radars is still operating but it is only watching civilian aircraft traffic in the area.

The name Mjørkadalur
The location is at the head of a valley where the clouds can be seen forming to travel over nearby peaks. Mjørki means Fog in Faroese and Dalur means Valley, Foggy Valley.

References

External links
Mjørkadals Idrætsforening

See also
 List of towns in the Faroe Islands

Former populated places in the Faroe Islands
Streymoy